John W. Parker is an attorney serving as a Judge for Montana's 8th Judicial Dsitrict Court. Before this, he served as a Democratic Party member of the Montana House of Representatives, representing District 23 from 2002 to 2008. During his tenure, he also served as the State House Minority Leader. He unsuccessfully sought the Democratic nomination for Montana Attorney General 2008, being defeated by Steve Bullock.

External links
Montana House of Representatives - John Parker official MT State Legislature website
Project Vote Smart - Representative John W. Parker (MT) profile
Follow the Money - John W Parker
 2006 2004 2002 1998 campaign contributions

Members of the Montana House of Representatives
1970 births
Living people